Matthew David Pascoe (born 10 January 1977 in Camperdown, New South Wales, New South Wales) is an Australian cricketer who played for Tasmania and Queensland. 

Pascoe played twice for Queensland in the Australian domestic first-class cricket competition during the 1998/99 and 2000/2001 seasons. Ahead of the 2001/02 season, Pascoe moved to Tasmania to establish his first class credentials when unable to break into the Queensland side. However, he only played one List A game for Tasmania and failed to win a permanent place in the Tasmania line-up, despite showing promising pace. He was not offered a new contract after the 2001/2002 season.

See also
 List of Tasmanian representative cricketers

References

External links
Cricinfo profile

1977 births
Living people
Australian cricketers
Tasmania cricketers
Queensland cricketers
Cricketers from Sydney